The Shura, also known as the Taran Kano in Hausa (meaning 'the Kano Nine' or 'Council of Nine'), is the legislative council of the Kano emirate. The precise date of its establishment is a matter of debate. According to the Kano Chronicle, the council is composed of nine officials, three of which are above the emir, three of which are equal to the emir, and three of which are below the emir.

Members of the Council
Galadima
Madaki
Alkali
Wambai
Makama
Sarkin Dawaki
Sarkin Bai
Dan-Iya
Chiroma

References 

History of Northern Nigeria
Politics of Northern Nigeria
Kano
History of Kano